Douglas Johnstone may refer to:

Doug Johnstone (born 1970), writer and musician
Dougie Johnstone (born 1969), footballer

See also
Douglas Johnston (disambiguation)
Douglas Johnson (disambiguation)